Walter Franco (6 January 1945 – 24 October 2019) was a Brazilian singer and composer. In 1998 he contributed to the Rosa Passos album Especial Tom Jobim. His 1975 album Revolver was No. 50 on Rolling Stones list of the Top 100 Brazilian albums.

Franco died on 24 October 2019 after spending two weeks in hospital following a stroke.  He was 74.

Discography
 1973: Ou Não
 1975: Revolver
 1978: Respire Fundo
 1980: Vela Aberta
 1982: Walter Franco
 2001: Tutano

References

External links
[ Allmusic]

1945 births
2019 deaths
Brazilian composers
20th-century Brazilian male singers
20th-century Brazilian singers